Pat Forde is a sports journalist who is a national columnist for Sports Illustrated. He previously worked for ESPN, The Courier-Journal in Louisville, Kentucky, and Yahoo Sports.

Personal life and education 
Forde is a native of Colorado Springs, Colorado. He currently lives in Louisville with his wife Tricia, a former swimmer at Northwestern University. All three of their children were college swimmers—son Mitchell at Missouri from 2013–2017, another son Clayton at Georgia from 2016–2020, and daughter Brooke at Stanford from 2017–2022. Brooke was a silver medalist in the Tokyo Olympics in 2021 as part of the USA 4 × 200m freestyle relay team.

Forde played high school football for Gary Barnett during his sophomore and junior years (1980–81) at Air Academy High School in Colorado Springs. He is a 1987 graduate of the University of Missouri in Columbia, Missouri.

Career

The Courier-Journal
Forde began his career in 1987 working as a journalist for The Courier-Journal, where his writing won numerous awards. He initially worked there as a beat reporter and then spent 12 years writing a column.

ESPN
In 2004, Forde left The Courier-Journal to join ESPN full-time after freelancing for their website for about seven years. During the NCAA football season, Forde wrote a column called "Forde Yard Dash", and during the NCAA basketball season, he wrote a column called "Forde Minutes". He also appeared on ESPN radio and television.

Yahoo! Sports
On November 1, 2011, after the expiration of his contract, Forde left ESPN to pursue a career with Yahoo Sports. There, he resumed his weekly "Forde Yard Dash" and, later, his "Forde Minutes" column as well.

Sports Illustrated 
On October 29, 2019, Forde joined Sports Illustrated as its new senior college sports writer. He continues to write both "Forde-Yard Dash" and "Forde Minutes" for SI.

Book on Rick Pitino
In 2008, Forde served as the co-author for University of Louisville basketball coach Rick Pitino's Rebound Rules: The Art of Success 2.0.

References 

 https://sports.yahoo.com/news/ncaaf--notre-dame-won-t-compromise-values-for-wins--so-deal-with-it.html

External links 
Forde's columns and stories for Sports Illustrated
Forde's columns at Yahoo Sports
Forde's columns on ESPN.com

Living people
1960s births
American sportswriters
Missouri School of Journalism alumni
College football announcers
American horse racing announcers
College basketball announcers in the United States
Writers from Colorado Springs, Colorado
Journalists from Kentucky
American male journalists
Writers from Louisville, Kentucky
Courier Journal people
Year of birth missing (living people)